The city of Vienna in Austria was bombed 52 times during World War II, and 37,000 houses of the city were lost, 20% of the entire city. Only 41 civilian vehicles survived the raids, and more than 3,000 bomb craters were counted.

History
After a lone Soviet air raid conducted on 4 September 1942, Vienna was reached by western Allied bombers in 1944, when the Allied invasion of Italy allowed them to establish an air base at Foggia. Following the Normandy Invasion the greater part of the German Air Force (Luftwaffe) was transferred to the West. Remaining Luftwaffe shot down one-tenth of 550 bombers in June 1944.

The air defences of Vienna were aided by a ring of anti-aircraft batteries set up around the city and three pairs of Flak towers.  These were large anti-aircraft gun blockhouses built in the city.  Due to the increasing lack of fuel, by autumn 1944, artillery on the ground was the only defence against air raids. It typically took some 5,000 small-calibre and 3,400 large-calibre shells to bring down one bomber. During the day, one out of 125 planes was shot down on average.  During the night, this dropped to only one out of 145. However, roughly one-third of the bombers and escorts suffered heavy damage. Some Vienna factories were moved to bomb-proof sites such as caves (e.g. the Seegrotte near Hinterbrühl) or hidden in other ways. The military industry boosted its production, also by use of forced labour of concentration camp inmates and POWs.  Bypasses for traffic junctions had been established before the bombings and traffic did not come to a halt until the very last days of the war.

By early 1945 Vienna had already faced 1,800 bombs. In February and March 1945, 80,000 tons of bombs were dropped by US and British aircraft, destroying more than 12,000 buildings, and 270,000 people were left homeless.

List of raids

References

External links
 The German air defense in Vienna

1944 in Austria
1945 in Austria
Vienna
1940s in Vienna
Austria in World War II
Austria–United Kingdom military relations
Austria–United States military relations
Vienna
Vienna